Dopamine is the debut studio album by American singer-songwriter Børns, released on October 16, 2015 by Interscope Records.

Background 
On August 19, 2015, Børns announced the album on Zane Lowe's Beats 1 Radio show. He also released the first official single from the album titled "The Emotion". He confirmed in an interview with SPIN Magazine in July that he was once again working with producer Tommy English (who produced the Candy EP). SPIN also confirmed that "he’s taking his melodies seriously though, calling on heavyweight producers like Emile Haynie (Lana Del Rey's Born to Die) and Jeff Bhasker (Kanye West's My Beautiful Dark Twisted Fantasy) for help".

He has stated during production he and Tommy English used "a lot of swoopy Beach Boys-esque harmonies" and that "Some of the songs were influenced by some old '60s and '70s Playboys, because those are the best ones in my opinion". He later claimed he wouldn't mask how he really felt stating "It's hard to fake that, - When you listen to music, you can tell if it's a real love song or not. I’m hoping that honesty will translate." A theme in the album is the feelings associated with love.

The lead single from the album is a track entitled "The Emotion" which the singer posted on his Vevo and was later released on iTunes and Apple Music. The album is preceded by his late-2014 debut EP Candy, which included the songs "Electric Love", "10,000 Emerald Pools" and "Past Lives".

At South by Southwest 2015, Børns played a set for Spotify at the Spotify House. He played "American Money" alongside two unreleased songs, "Broke" (originally titled "So I Broke") and "Let You Down".

A Target edition of the album has also been released, containing two additional tracks, called "Rolling in the Roses" and "A Song for the Stoned Girl in My Bed."

Critical reception

Dopamine'''s release was met with positive reviews from music critics. Neil Yeung from AllMusic gave the album 4 out of 5 stars, stating that everything on the album is coated thick with honey, and praised the album production.  In a positive review, Tina Roumeliotis from The Daily Listening named the musician "the male Zella Day", and concluded that "Dopamine is definitely an album worth picking up this fall". Connor Smith from The Paper'' also gave the album a rating of 4 out of 5 stars and said that "Børns is drastically better than Lana Del Rey". On Album of the Year, the album holds a critic score of 70 out of 100, based on 4 reviews, and a user score of 77, based on 124 ratings.

Track listing

Charts

References

2015 debut albums
Børns albums
Interscope Records albums